Les Eyzies is a commune in the Dordogne department in Nouvelle-Aquitaine in southwestern France. It was established on 1 January 2019 by merger of the former communes of Les Eyzies-de-Tayac-Sireuil (the seat), Manaurie and Saint-Cirq. Les Eyzies station has rail connections to Périgueux and Agen.

References

Communes of Dordogne
Populated places established in 2019
2019 establishments in France